Thomas Bosmel (born 18 April 1988) is a French professional footballer who plays for Mondeville. He also appeared in Ligue 1 with Caen (2012-2014) and in Ligue 2 with Arles-Avignon (2014-2015).

References

1988 births
Living people
Footballers from Caen
French footballers
Association football goalkeepers
Stade Malherbe Caen players
AC Arlésien players
Ligue 1 players
Ligue 2 players